Exame Informática is a Portuguese monthly computer magazine published in Portugal.

History and profile
Exame Informática was first published in June 1995. The magazine was published monthly by Medipress Publishing. In 2018 Portuguese company Trust in News (TIN) acquired the magazine. The magazine is based in Lisbon.

It is an information technology magazine and every month is accompanied by a CD or a DVD (as is purchased or signed).

In 2007 Exame Informática had a circulation of 34,000 copies.

See also
 List of magazines in Portugal

References

External links
Official Website 

1995 establishments in Portugal
Computer magazines
Magazines established in 1995
Magazines published in Lisbon
Monthly magazines published in Portugal
Portuguese-language magazines
Science and technology in Portugal